Raï'n'B Fever is a collective of mainly Algerian Raï, R&B and rap/urban artists contributing their best output of the Raï'n'B genre of music with fusion of elements of both genres in a series of albums also called Raï'n'B Fever albums.

The collective and the albums were the idea of the DJ duo Kore & Skalp as duo Kore & Skalp, who in a matter of years became the most known producers of the genre.

The initial album was released with great commercial success in 2004, followed by a number of follow-up albums produced by Kore and his brother DJ Bellek in 2006 and 2008, a special album 2009 (Même pas fatigué) and another by Kore in 2011.

Some artists contributing to the albums
113, Abdelhafid Douzi, Akil, Amine, AP, Big Ali, Bilal, Cheb Bilal, Cheb Mami, Cheba Maria, Corneille, Diam's, DJ Belek, DJ Kore, GSX, DJ Skalp, Faudel, Idir, J-Mi Sissoko, Justine, Kader Riwan, KameLanc', Kenza Farah, Kayliah, Khaled, L'Algérino, La Fouine, Leïla Remi, Leslie, LIM, M. Pokora, Magic System, Mister you, Mohamed Lamine, Mokobé, Mustapha, Najim, Nessbeal, Omar et Fred, Reda Taliani, Relic, Rim'K, Rohff, Sexion d'Assaut, Shayneze, Sinik, Six Coups MC, Sniper, Sweety, Tunisiano, Willy Denzey.

Raï'n'B Fever

Year: 2004
Producer: Kore & Scalp
Track list:
 "Intro – Bonjour la France" – (Omar & Fred)
 "Un gaou à Oran" – (113 – Magic System, Mohamed Lamine)
 "Sobri" – (Leslie – Amine)
 "Mon bled" – (Rohff, Mohamed Lamine, Chebba Maria)
 "Le génie" – (Amine, La Fouine)
 "Retour aux sources" – (Rim'K, Khaled, Mohamed Lamine)
 "Raï'n'b Fever" – (Faudel, Jérôme Pristel)
 "Reggae Raï Fever" – (J-Mi Sissoko, Cheb Tarik)
 "J'suis pas d'ici" – (OGB, Sahraoui)
 "Just Married" – (Amine, Relic)
 "Neya" – (Mohamed Lamine, Kayliah)
 "Madame, Madame" – (Omar & Fred)
 "Yeppa mama" – (Cheb Bilal, Leila Rami)
 "Ma Leila" – (Shakeen, Yaleil)
 "L'orphelin" – (Willy Denzey, Kader Riwan)
 "Rimitti Ridim" – (Cheikha Rimitti)
 "Outro – Chabani Nonda" – (Omar & Fred)

Raï'n'B Fever 2

Year: 2006
Producers: Kore & Bellek
Track list:
 "Intro – Hey madame" – (Omar & Fred, Mustapha)
 "C cho ça brûle" – (Big Ali, Magic System, Bilal, Akil)
 "200 degrés" – (Zahouania, Bilal, Nessbeal, Big Ali)
 "Crunk didi" – (Amerie, Willy Denzey, Six Coups MC)
 "Sobri 2" – (Amine, Leslie)
 "Non c'sera non" – (Cheb Mami, Diam's)
 "Africa Riddim" – (Amadou et Mariam, Taoues, Leslie)
 "Ola Ola" – (Kamel Shadi, Sweety, LS )
 "D'où je viens" – (Idir, Rim'K, Sniper)
 "Rainbfever.com" – (Amine, M. Pokora)
 "Interlude" – (Dj Youcef)
 "A moi la vie" – (Douzi, Justine, Six Coups MC, Big Ali)
 "H'bibi I love you" – (Amine, Kelly Rowland)
 "Cholé Cholé" – (Reda Taliani, Rappeur d'instinct)
 "Reviens moi" –  (Shareen, Cheb Bilal, Malika, Al Peco)
 "Ibiza a Tamanrasset" – (Mustapha, Omar & Fred)

Raï'n'B Fever 3

Raï'n'B Fever 3 (by Kore & Bellek)

Year: 2008
Producer: Kore & Bellek
Track list
 "Bienvenue Chez les Bylkas" – (Sinik, Big Ali & Cheb Bilal)
 "Ya Mama" – (Kenza Farah & Najim)
 "Habibi" – (Leslie & Amar)
 "Crois en tes rêves" – (Amel Bent & Mohamed Reda)
 "Amitiés Sacrés" – (TLF & Zahouania)
 "Te Quiero" – (Amine & Kayliah)
 " Ca passe ou ça Kasse" – (Tunisiano, Reda Taliani)
 "Jusqu'au bout du monde" – (Willy Denzey & Najim)
 "Raï-Kaï" – (LIM, Reda Talliani & Samira)
 "Origines" – (Melissa M & Amine)
 "Cette soirée là" – (K-reen, Kamelancien & Cheb Hassen)
 "C L'ambiance" – (L'Algérino & Sahraoui)
 "Ya dellali" – (Cheb Billal & Shynèze)
 "Emmène-moi" – (Akil & Leïla Rami)
 "Il Suffira" – (Shaheen & Yalleil)
 "Ya Denia" – (Chebba Maria, Cheb Amar & Aketo)

Raï'n'B Fever 3 Même pas fatigué

Year: 2009
Producer:
Track list
CD1
 "Bienvenue Chez les Bylkas" – (Sinik, Big Ali & Cheb Bilal)
 "Ya Mama" – (Kenza Farah & Najim)
 "Habibi" – (Leslie & Amar)
 "Crois en tes rêves" – (Amel Bent & Mohamed Reda)
 "Amitiés Sacrés" – (TLF & Zahouania)
 "Te Quiero" – (Amine & Kayliah)
 " Ca passe ou ça Kasse" – (Tunisiano Reda Taliani)
 "Jusqu'au bout du monde" – (Willy Denzey & Najim)
 "Raï-Kaï" – (LIM, Reda Talliani & Samira)
 "Origines" – (Melissa M & Amine)
 "Cette soirée là" – (K-reen, Kamelancien & Cheb Hassen)
 "C L'ambiance" – (L'Algérino & Sahraoui)
 "Ya dellali" – (Cheb Billal & Shynèze)
 "Emmène-moi" – (Akil & Leïla Rami)
 "Il Suffira" – (Shaheen & Yalleil)
 "Ya Denia" – (Chebba Maria, Cheb Amar & Aketo)
 "Kellem" – (Chebba bilal & Selma)

CD2
 "Même pas fatigué !!!" – (Khaled & Magic System)
 "Elle et moi" – (Mohamed Reda & Vitaa)
 "Bienvenue Chez Les Bylkas Remix" – (Big Ali & Mohamed Allaoua & Sinik)
 "Mais Il Faut Croire En Ses Rêves" – (Amel Bent)
 "Amitiés Sacrés" (Version Thug) – (TLF & Zahouania) 
 "Même Pas Fatigué!!!" (remix club by DJ Jul'S) – (Khaled & Magic System)
 "Bienvenue Chez Les Bylkas" (bonus)

Raï'n'B Fever 4

Year: 2011
Producer: Kore
Track list:
 "Sahbi" – (Kore & Sexion d'Assaut)
 "Vas-y Molo" – (Kore & Magic System, Mohamed Allaoua & Shaggy)
 "Heya" – (Khalass, Kore & Psy4 De La Rime)
 "Je Veux Chanter" / "Interlude" – (Kore & Brulé)
 "Zahwani-You" – (Kore, Lacrim, Mister You & Zahouani)
 "Tu Mérites Mieux" – (Isleym, Kore, Le Rat Luciano & Najim)
 "Gewatane Fever" – (GSX, Khalass, Kore & Seth Gueko)
 "Ma Voie" – (Amar, Kore & TLF)
 "T'as Pas Assez" – (18 K-Ra, Khalass, Kore & Pitbull)
 "Alabina Beach" – (Amine, Kore, Kulture Shock)
 "Loin" – (Cheb Mami, Kenza Farah & Kore)
 "Nous On S'en fout" – (Amine, Kore, Logobi GT & Still Fresh)
 "J'ai Décidé" – (Cheba Sousou, Kore, Meh)
 "Allaoui Fever" – (Hanini, Kore & Sofiane)
 "Vote Ou Rai" part 1 – (Balti, Kore, Lotfi Double Kanon & Mister You)
 "Vote Ou Rai" part 2 – (Nabila, AM-1, Benks, Diden, Fromage, Harone, Kore & L'Abbé Mase)

Music videos
(selective)
2004 : "Un Gaou a Oran" – 113, Magic System and Mohamed Lamine
2004 : "L'orphelin" – Willy Denzey and Kader Riwan
2004 : "Sobri" – Leslie and Amine
2004 : "Just Married" – Relic and Amine
2006 : "C cho ça brule" – Big Ali, Magic System, Cheb Bilal and Cheb Akil)
2006 : "Sobri 2" – Leslie and Amine
2008 : "Bienvenue chez les bylkas" – Sinik, Big Ali and Cheb Bilal
2009 : "Méme pas fatigué" – Magic System and Khaled
2011 : "The Rai'n'b 4" – GSX and Cheb Khalass

Compilation album series
Musical collectives